Hawkins\Brown Architects LLP is an architectural practice with studios in London and Manchester.

History 
Roger Hawkins and Russell Brown set up Hawkins\Brown in 1988.

In recent years Hawkins\Brown has won and been shortlisted for awards including the Architects' Journal (AJ) Practice of the Year and AJ Employer of the Year.  It has appeared at the Venice Biennale twice and has been shortlisted for the RIBA Stirling Prize for their work on the iconic Park Hill in Sheffield, Europe's largest listed building. In 2016 Hawkins\Brown received a 2 Star Accreditation with The Sunday Times 100 Best Companies to Work For. Their Beecroft Building for the University of Oxford Department of Physics, opened in 2018, was shortlisted for the RIBA national awards in 2019.

Publications 
Hawkins\Brown has published a number of books and journals, including:
 The #GreatSchools Manifesto, Published by Hawkins\Brown and Architects Journal
 AR Supplement Hawkins\Brown Social, Published by Architectural Review as a supplement to their June edition, 2013
 Ideas Exchange: The collaborative Studio of Hawkins\Brown, Published by Birkhäuser 
 Salt Bridges: Changing Perceptions of Art/Architecture and Science, Published by Prestel Publishing
 &\Also: Hawkins\Brown, Published by Black Dog Publishing

References

External links 

 

Interior design firms
Architectural designers
Urban designers
Architecture firms based in London
Design companies established in 1988
1988 establishments in England